There are many notable alumni of St Joseph's College, Gregory Terrace, Brisbane, Queensland, Australia.

Rhodes Scholars
 James C. Mahoney (1929)
 Henry Finucan (1937)
 Colin Apelt (1954)
 Cedric Hampson (1955)
 James J. Mahoney (1963)
 John Corbett (1965)
 Hayden Mitchell (1969)
 Patrick Carroll (1974)
 Michael Wilson (1976)
 Peter Donnelly (1980)
 Bryan Horrigan (1986)
 John Devereaux (1988)
 Liam Kelly (1989)
 Andrew Rosengren (1991)
 Robert Dann (1997)
 Ben White (1998)
 Ben Juratowich (2003)
 Simon Quinn (2004)
Damian Maher (2018)

Cultural, political, and legal
 Ron Boswell, Senator - Father of the Australian Senate 
 Bernard Fanning – lead singer of Powderfinger
 Bobby Flynn – finalist on 2006 Australian Idol
 Osher Günsberg – television, host of the Australian Bachelor franchise (The Bachelor, The Bachelorette, Bachelor In Paradise) & The Masked Singer
 Steve Hambleton – Australian Medical Association past President (2011–2014)
 Denis Handlin, AO, former Chairman & Chief Executive Officer of Sony Music Entertainment Australia.
 John Hogg, Senator
 Patrick Keane, Justice of the High Court of Australia (since 2013), formerly Chief Justice of the Federal Court of Australia (2010–2013)
 Ben Lawson – actor on Neighbours
 Josh Lawson – actor and comedian
 Hugh Lunn - journalist and author.
 Brett Sheehy AO - artistic director, producer and curator
 Joseph Sheehy KBE – Senior Puisne Judge of the Queensland Supreme Court and Administrator of the State of Queensland

Sporting
 Marcus Allan – AFL (Brisbane Lions)
 Oliver Anderson – tennis player
 Connor Ballenden- AFL Footballer
 Jordon Bourke – AFL (Brisbane Lions) 
 Patrick Carrigan -Rugby League player (Brisbane Broncos)
 Mark Chisholm – Rugby union player (ACT Brumbies and Wallabies)
 Jimmy Clark – Rugby union player (Queensland Reds and Wallaby Captain)
 David Croft – Rugby union player (Queensland Reds and Wallabies)
 Mick Doohan –  five time 500cc motorcycle Grand Prix champion
 Jimmy Flynn – Rugby union player (Queensland Reds and Wallaby Captain)
 Liam Gill – Rugby union player (Queensland Reds)
 Chris Handy – Rugby union player (Queensland and Australia).
 James Hanson – Rugby union player (Queensland Reds)
 Digby Ioane – Rugby union player (Queensland Reds and Wallabies)
 Ben Keays – AFL (Brisbane Lions)
 Ben Lucas – Rugby union player (Queensland Reds)
 Michael Lynagh – Rugby union player (Queensland Reds and Wallaby Captain)
 Lachlan Maranta – Rugby league player (Brisbane Broncos)
Jack Prestwidge – Cricket player (Brisbane Heat and Queensland cricket team)
Will Prestwidge – Cricket player (Brisbane Heat and Queensland cricket team)
 Harry Roberts – rugby union player (Queensland Reds and Wallabies)
 Tony Shaw – rugby union player (Queensland Reds and Wallaby Captain)
Glen Vaihu – (Melbourne Rebels)
 Rudi Vedelago – rugby union player (Western Force)
 Tom Williams – AFL (Western Bulldogs)
 Reuben William – AFL (Brisbane Lions)
 Harry Wilson – Rugby union player (Queensland Reds and Wallabies)
 Clem Windsor – Rugby union player (Queensland Reds and Wallabies)
 Logan Wade – Baseball (Australia and Brisbane Bandits)

References

Lists of people educated in Queensland by school affiliation
Brisbane-related lists